One ship of the Royal Navy has borne the name HMS Aggressor, while another was planned:

  was a 14-gun gun-brig launched in 1801 and sold in 1815.
She was ordered 1945 but cancelled later that year.

Royal Navy ship names